The 45th (Nottinghamshire) (Sherwood Foresters) Regiment of Foot was a British Army line infantry regiment, raised in 1741. The regiment saw action during Father Le Loutre's War, the French and Indian War and the American Revolutionary War as well as the Peninsular War, the First Anglo-Burmese War and the Xhosa Wars. Under the Childers Reforms it amalgamated with the 95th (Derbyshire) Regiment of Foot to form the Sherwood Foresters (Nottinghamshire and Derbyshire Regiment) in 1881.

History

Warburton's Regiment

Prior to 1751, the Regiment was named after Colonel Hugh Warburton. The regiment was originally raised by Colonel Daniel Houghton as Houghton's Regiment in 1741 for service during the War of the Austrian Succession. It was first posted to Gibraltar in 1745, before moving to Nova Scotia in 1747 for garrison duty under the command of Warburton. The regiment was ranked as the 56th Regiment of Foot in 1747 but was re-ranked the following year as the 45th Regiment of Foot in 1748. On 1 July 1751 the regiment officially adopted the numerical system rather being named after the commander. The regiment fell victim to a raid on Dartmouth in May 1751 during Father Le Loutre's War when French monarchist (natives and Acadians) from  Chignecto, under the command of Acadian Joseph Broussard, raided Dartmouth, Nova Scotia, destroying the town, killing twenty British villagers and torturing and mutilating a sergeant from the 45th Foot. The regiment then defeated the French monarchists (French soldiers, natives and Acadians) at the Battle of Fort Beauséjour in June 1755. The regiment also took part in the Siege of Louisbourg in July 1758 during the French and Indian War.

The regiment also saw action in North America during the American War of Independence, fighting at the Battle of Long Island in August 1776 before returning to England in 1778. In 1779 the citizens of Nottinghamshire petitioned for the regiment to have the county name included in the regimental name: this was granted and the regiment became the 45th (1st Nottinghamshire) Regiment. In March 1786 the regiment embarked for the West Indies and garrisoned Martinique, Dominica and Îles des Saintes during the French Revolutionary Wars. In May 1801, on the home journey, some 150 French prisoners aboard the ship, the Windsor, overpowered the guard, locked the officers in their cabins and took possession of the ship.

Notable soldiers 
 Winckworth Tonge
 Horatio Gates
 Patrick Sutherland

Gallery

Napoleonic wars
In spring 1807 the regiment embarked on the disastrous British invasion of the River Plate: it saw action at the Second Battle of Buenos Aires in July 1807 but, in the face of defeat, discipline collapsed and eleven men of the regiment completely disappeared. However another unit of the regiment successfully charged the enemy, taking two howitzers and many prisoners.

The regiment embarked for Portugal in July 1808 to serve under General Sir Arthur Wellesley in the Peninsular War. The regiment fought at the Battle of Roliça in August 1808, the Battle of Vimeiro later that month and the Battle of Talavera, where it won the nickname "Old Stubborns", in July 1809. The regiment went on to fight at the Battle of Bussaco in September 1810 before falling back to the Lines of Torres Vedras. It saw action again at Battle of Fuentes de Oñoro in May 1811, the Siege of Ciudad Rodrigo in January 1812 and the Siege of Badajoz in March 1812 before fighting at the Battle of Salamanca in July 1812 and the Battle of Vitoria in June 1813. It then pursued the French Army into France and fought at the Battle of the Pyrenees in July 1813, the Battle of Nivelle in November 1813 and the Battle of Orthez in February 1814 as well as the Battle of Toulouse in April 1814. The regiment returned home in June 1814.

The regiment was sent to Ceylon in January 1819 and to Burma in 1824 for service in the First Anglo-Burmese War. It formed part of an army which advanced up the River Irrawaddy to the Kingdom of Ava and then returned to England in March 1838.

The Victorian era

In May 1838 the regiment took part in the Battle of Bossenden Wood, a skirmish between a small group of labourers from the Hernhill, Dunkirk, and Boughton area and a detachment of soldiers of the 45th regiment sent from Canterbury to arrest the marchers' leader, the self-styled Sir William Courtenay, who was actually John Nichols Tom, a Truro maltster who had spent four years in Kent County Lunatic Asylum. 

In November 1839 the regiment was involved in suppressing the Newport Rising which had been organised by Chartist protestors.

The regiment was deployed to South Africa in 1843 and saw action in the Seventh Xhosa War in 1846 and the Eighth Xhosa War in 1851 before returning home in 1859. In 1866, the regiment became the 45th (Nottinghamshire) (Sherwood Foresters) Regiment of Foot. It took part in the British Expedition to Abyssinia in 1867.

As part of the Cardwell Reforms of the 1870s, where single-battalion regiments were linked together to share a single depot and recruiting district in the United Kingdom, the 45th was linked with the 17th (Leicestershire) Regiment of Foot), and assigned to district no. 27 at Glen Parva Barracks in Leicestershire. On 1 July 1881 the Childers Reforms came into effect and the regiment amalgamated with the 95th (Derbyshire) Regiment to form the Sherwood Foresters.

Battle honours
The regiment's battle honours were as follows:
Louisburg,
Rolica, Vimiera, Talavera, Busaco, Fuentes D'Onoro, Ciudad Rodrigo, Badajoz, Salamanca, Vittoria, Pyrenees, Nivelle, Orthes, Toulouse, Peninsula,
Ava,
South Africa 1846–47,

Colonels of the Regiment
Colonels of the regiment were:

1741–1745: Brig-Gen. Daniel Houghton

45th Regiment of Foot – (1751)
1745–1761: Gen. Hugh Warburton
1761: Maj-Gen. Andrew Robinson
1761–1767: Maj-Gen. Hon. John Boscawen
1767–1784: Gen. William Haviland

45th (Nottinghamshire) Regiment of Foot
1784–1787: Maj-Gen. Sir John Wrottesley, 8th Baronet
1787–1788: Lt-Gen. James Cuninghame
1788–1802: Gen. James Whorwood Adeane
1802–1823: Gen. Frederick Cavendish Lister
1823–1837: Gen. Richard Lambart, 7th Earl of Cavan, KC
1837–1840: Lt-Gen. Sir William Henry Pringle, GCB
1840–1847: Gen. Sir Fitzroy Jeffries Grafton Maclean, Bt.
1847–1856: Gen. Sir Colin Halkett, GCB, GCH
1856–1858: Gen. Thomas Brabazon Aylmer
1858–1866: F.M. Sir Hugh Rose, 1st Baron Strathnairn, GCB, GCSI

45th (Nottinghamshire) (Sherwood Foresters) Regiment of Foot
1866–1868: Gen. Thomas Armstrong Drought
1868–1876: Gen. Frederick Horn, GCB
1876–1878: Gen. Henry Cooper
1878–1881: Gen. Sir Daniel Lysons, GCB

References

Sources

Further reading

External links
Frank Burton  45th Regiment of Foot

Infantry regiments of the British Army
Military units and formations in Nottinghamshire
Military units and formations of the United Kingdom in the Peninsular War
Regiments of the British Army in the American Revolutionary War
Military units and formations disestablished in 1881